Francis Kabenlah Anaman (born 26 July 1960) is a Ghanaian politician and member of the Sixth Parliament of the Fourth Republic of Ghana. He represented the Jomoro Constituency in the Western Region on the ticket of the National Democratic Congress.

Early life and education 
Anaman was born on 26 July 1960. He hails from Tikobo, a town in the Western Region of Ghana. He attended the Kwame Nkrumah University of Science and Technology and obtained a bachelor's degree in Economics and Sociology. He earned his postgraduate diploma in Public Administration from the Ghana Institute of Management and Public Administration in 1999.

Career 
Anaman was a military officer of the Ghana Armed Forces.

Politics 
Anaman is a member of the National Democratic Congress (NDC). In 2012, he contested for the Jomoro seat on the ticket of the NDC in the 2012 Ghanaian General Elections and won. He won against the incumbent member parliament Samia Nkrumah the daughter of Ghana's first president.

Personal life 
Anaman is married with three children. He is a Christian.

References 

1960 births
Living people
National Democratic Congress (Ghana) politicians
Kwame Nkrumah University of Science and Technology alumni
People from Western Region (Ghana)
Ghana Institute of Management and Public Administration alumni
Ghanaian MPs 2013–2017